Que tu fe nunca muera (English: That your faith never dies) is the 18th studio album by Mexican pop singer Yuri. It was released in 2000 and was produced by her husband Rodrigo Espinoza.

Reception
Yuri openly demonstrates with this album her evangelistic faith with a style of rancheras and gospel music. However, this album did not succeed in the stores nor secular radio stations, but it gathered success in Christian radio stations. It sold more than 25,000.

Track listing

Singles

Secular radio stations
 Que Tu Fe Nunca Muera

Christian radio stations
 María Magdalena
 Volver a Empezar
 Su Venida
 Machacalo

2000 albums
Yuri (Mexican singer) albums